The Market Bosworth School (formerly Market Bosworth High School) is a secondary school with academy status located in the small town of Market Bosworth in Leicestershire, England. The school was rated 'Outstanding' in its 2018 OFSTED inspection.

Market Bosworth was established in 1969, as a comprehensive school for both sexes of any ability between the ages of 11 and 14. The school is next door to Dixie Grammar School.

Students start after leaving primary schools in villages such as Barlestone, Newbold Verdon and Desford.

In October 2012 a question posed by students at Market Bosworth High School  was the first to be used in the world's first live broadcast via Facebook of a science lesson at the Royal Albert Hall, in London. The broadcast was streamed live via the internet to classrooms across the world over 15 minutes to an online audience of thousands, including pupils from the Leicestershire school. The question posed by pupils was "can sound warm objects up?" It was selected by organisers as their favourite and was answered by Dallas Campbell and Dr Yan Wong, presenters of BBC1 show Bang Goes The Theory.

In March 2013 TMBS won the National Science and Engineering Week Award for Best Secondary School Event of the year. Their four-day 'TMBS Year 5 Science Fairs' were host to 250 Year 5 pupils from local primary schools and opened by former Leicester City Football Club captain Steve Walsh.

In November 2018 TMBS made news for a controversial suspension, in which a girl was suspended for throwing a Haribo sweet at a teacher during a Children in Need fundraiser. It was considered as an 'assault' by TMBS, and it made local and national news for what was perceived by the media to be an over the top disciplinary measure.

Notable former pupils
 Colin Pitchfork – the first person convicted of murder based on DNA fingerprinting evidence

References

External links
The Market Bosworth School Website

Educational institutions established in 1969
Secondary schools in Leicestershire
1969 establishments in England
Academies in Leicestershire
Market Bosworth